Freddi Fish 4: The Case of the Hogfish Rustlers of Briny Gulch is a 1999 video game and the fourth of five adventure games in the Freddi Fish series of games. It was developed and published by Humongous Entertainment.

Plot
Freddi and Luther are on their way to Calico Ranch in Briny Gulch to meet Freddi's cousin, Calico Catfish, who agreed to teach them to raise hogfish. When they arrive, Cousin Calico tells them her prized hogfish herd had been rustled and that she couldn't call the authorities as the Sheriff was supposedly out of town. Freddi and Luther offer to help find the hogfish and catch the rustlers. 

After entering the Town square, the two meet Saltwater Stella, the owner and operator of the local "sodaloon". She tells them that two suspicious characters entered the sodaloon the other day. While investigating, Luther finds a note dropped by the rustlers, which mentions a meeting at the Rusty Rustler, a local shipwreck, at High Tide. When they arrive at the wreck, they enter the combination code from the note to the hatch entrance and succeed to pry open the entrance. Freddi hears the hogfish grunting from inside. A rustler, the slim fish, stops them from entering and mentions the hideout is for rustlers only. The rustlers are seriously fashion-cautious, so they won't accept Freddi and Luther until they have the proper attire. Using the magazine advertisement the rustler gave them, Freddi and Luther then set out to find materials for making rustler disguises.

Once they have the materials, they can get in the wreck and liberate the hogfish. Luther pops out of the disguise and the rustlers capture and imprison them. The duo soon realizes their cell is just above the hogfish. Going down and meeting the hogfish, they squeeze out of a tiny hole in the hogfish cell. Exploring around the wreck and finding a hook, the two free the hogfish with the hook attached to an anchor's chain locking onto the window of the hogfish's cell. Luther engages the anchor to be lowered and the window is torn out, freeing the hogfish. 

Finally, Freddi and Luther need to find out who the mysterious Mr. Big is. Freddi explains that she and Luther passed by one of the townsfolk about the plan of rustling the hogfish when they reached the cell and found the evidence. After exposing him, Mr. Big explains the whole situation about capturing the hogfish. Freddi says, "you shouldn't take things that don't belong to you, it hurts other people", and the culprit learned a valuable lesson. 

In the end, the rustlers get to have their dream job - hogfish ranching. Cousin Calico thanks Freddi and Luther for helping and gives a ten-gallon hat to Freddi and a five-gallon hat to Luther and teaches them how to lasso to be Hogfish Ranchers in the Wild West. 

During the credits, Freddi and Luther sing "Home on the Range". Sometimes, Luther adds on singing "Clementine".

Gameplay
The game uses the same principles as its predecessors, but similar to the third game, it has multiple endings on who the main culprit is based on evidence Freddi and Luther find. There are four possible suspects, and each one has a different reason for stealing the hogfish. These are Eight Finger Phil, Nelson Torso, Sahara Slim and Gill Barker (from the previous game) and they have different reasons for planning the rustling.

Reception

Freddi Fish 4: The Case of the Hogfish Rustlers of Briny Gulch was generally well-received, getting scores of 85% from GameBlitz, 93% from Gamer's Pulse, 4.5 out of 5 stars from Review Corner, 4.5 out of 5 stars from Metzomagic and Unikgamer gave a 6.5 out 10 score. Review Corner also gave this game the Award of Excellence.

During the year 2001 alone, Freddi Fish 4 sold 65,106 retail units in North America, according to PC Data.

References

External links
 
 Freddi Fish 4: The Case of the Hogfish Rustlers of Briny Gulch at Humongous Entertainment

1999 video games
Humongous Entertainment games
Infogrames games
Adventure games
IOS games
Linux games
Classic Mac OS games
ScummVM-supported games
Video games featuring female protagonists
Windows games
Point-and-click adventure games
Video games developed in the United States
Single-player video games
Video games with alternate endings
Children's educational video games
Detective video games
Video games with underwater settings
Western (genre) video games
Tommo games